Mohsin Hasan Khan (Urdu: محسن حسن خان; born 15 March 1955) is a Pakistani cricket coach, actor and former cricketer who played in 48 Test matches and 75 One Day Internationals between 1977 and 1986 mainly as an opening batsman.

Early life
Born in Karachi to a father who was an officer in the Pakistan Navy and a United States-educated mother who was a teacher and vice-principal, Mohsin excelled at sports early on, in tennis, swimming and cricket, and even went on to become junior badminton champion of Pakistan.

International career
Playing as the opener for Pakistan against India at Lahore in 1982–83, he scored 101 not out of Pakistan's second-innings total of 135/1. This is the lowest team score in Test cricket to have included a century.

Mohsin was one of a minority of South Asian players to come to terms with conditions in Australia and England, scoring two consecutive centuries in Australia in 1983/84 and becoming the first Pakistani batsman to score a Test double century at Lord's, which he did earlier in 1982.

Cricket administration
On 2 March 2010, Mohsin Khan was named Iqbal Qasim's successor as chief selector of the Pakistan national cricket team. He accepted the role turned down by former Captain Saeed Anwar. Mohsin was Pakistan's fourth chief of selectors in the 12 months of 2009–10. He was appointed as interim coach of the Pakistan team on 3 October 2011 while the PCB formed a committee to search for a certified coach. Mohsin Khan was removed as interim coach once Dav Whatmore was selected as Pakistan's permanent coach in early 2012. Since being removed as interim coach, Mohsin Khan has applied for the coaching position on several occasions without any success. He is currently based in Karachi and can be seen on various private TV channels, continuously looking for a role with the PCB.

Personal life and beyond cricket
Mohsin married Bollywood movie star Reena Roy in 1983, and had a short career as an actor in the Indian film industry starting with J P Dutta's 1989 film Batwara. His biggest success in Bollywood was Mahesh Bhatt's crime thriller Saathi (1991), co-starring Aditya Pancholi and Varsha Usgaonkar. He also acted in several films in Pakistan in the 90s. He divorced Roy in the 1990s and got the custody of their daughter, Sanam. He later remarried and lost the custody of the daughter. He currently lives in Karachi, Pakistan and his daughter, Sanam, now lives with her mother in India. He had named his daughter Jannat, but she is now called Sanam.

Filmography

1997 Mahaanta
1996 Kudiyon Ko Daale Daana
1996 Ghunghat
1994 Beta
1994 Madam X 
1993 Haathi Mere Saathi
1993 Jannat
1992 Laat Saab
1991 Saathi (blockbuster)
1991 Pratikar
1991 Gunehgar Kaun
1991 Fateh
1989 Batwara (Nominated - Filmfare Award for Best Supporting Actor)

References

External links
 
 Mohsin Khan Film Career Profile – IMDb.com

1955 births
Living people
Pakistani cricketers
Pakistan Test cricketers
Pakistan One Day International cricketers
Pakistani male film actors
Pakistani cricket commentators
Cricketers at the 1983 Cricket World Cup
Pakistani expatriate male actors in India
Sindh cricketers
Karachi cricketers
Habib Bank Limited cricketers
Pakistani cricket coaches
Coaches of the Pakistan national cricket team
Cricketers from Karachi
Karachi Whites cricketers
Karachi Blues cricketers
Pakistan Universities cricketers
Sind A cricketers
Pakistan Railways B cricketers
Punjab (Pakistan) cricketers
Male actors in Hindi cinema
Cricketers who have acted in films